Åkersvika is a  wetland nature reserve and Ramsar site in Hamar, Norway. It became Norway's first Ramsar site in 1974.
Vikingskipet, the speed skating venue for the 1994 Winter Olympics, was built in the site, creating controversy. European Route E6 also runs through the site, and the Norwegian Public Roads Administration has plans to expand the road to a four-lane motorway.

References

Nature reserves in Norway
Ramsar sites in Norway
1974 establishments in Norway
Hamar
Protected areas established in 1974